Catocala juncta is a moth of the family Erebidae first described by Staudinger in 1889. It is found in Xinjiang, China.

References

Moths described in 1889
juncta
Moths of Asia